North Branch is a small farming community located on the West coast of the island of Newfoundland in the Canadian province of Newfoundland and Labrador. The name takes its name from its close proximity of the Codroy River near the banks of the north branch of that river.

See also
 List of communities in Newfoundland and Labrador

Populated places in Newfoundland and Labrador